Laima Muktupāvela Kota (born 20 January 1962 in Rēzekne) is a Latvian author.

Life
Muktupāvela was born in 1962 and she graduated with a History degree in 1989. She worked at various jobs until she became a full-time writer in 2000 after working part-time on published works for seven years.  She won a prize for her work Šampinjonu Derība (The Mushroom Testament). She is now married to a Turkish poet and says that she will publish further work under her married name.

She has converted to the Islamic religion in 2011.

Novels 
Šampinjonu Derība (The Mushroom Testament)

References 

1962 births
Converts to Islam
Living people
Latvian Muslims
Latvian writers
Latvian women writers
People from Rēzekne